Thomas Lewis (c. 1679 – 22 November 1736) of Soberton, Hampshire, was a British Tory and then Whig politician who sat in the House of Commons between 1708 and 1736.

Life

Lewis was the eldest surviving son of Richard Lewis, MP, of Edington and Corsham, Wiltshire and his wife Mary James. He attended Salisbury School and succeeded his father in 1706, inheriting estates at Corsham in Wiltshire and The Van in Glamorgan.

He married firstly Anna Maria Curll, daughter of Sir Walter Curll, 1st Baronet of Soberton. She died in 1709 and he married secondly in February 1710, Elizabeth Turnour of St. Martin-in-the-Fields, with whom he had a daughter. He lived at Soberton, which he inherited by his first marriage.

Lewis was returned as a Tory Member of Parliament (MP) for Whitchurch on 5 May 1708, but was unseated on petition on 21 December 1708. At the 1710 British general election, he was returned as MP for Winchester. He was then returned for Hampshire at the 1713 British general election.

At the 1715 British general election he was returned as Tory MP for Southampton and was returned again at the 1722 British general election. In 1726 he switched to supporting Walpole's ministry. He became MP for Salisbury at the 1727 British general election and then for Portsmouth at the 1734 British general election.

Lewis died on 22 November 1736, leaving his estates, which were heavily encumbered, to his only grandchild, Other Windsor, 4th Earl of Plymouth, with remainder successively to Sir Robert and Horace Walpole. His tomb in Soberton was sculpted by Peter Scheemakers.

References

1670s births
1736 deaths
British MPs 1708–1710
British MPs 1713–1715
British MPs 1715–1722
British MPs 1722–1727
British MPs 1727–1734
British MPs 1734–1741
Members of the Parliament of Great Britain for English constituencies
People educated at Salisbury Cathedral School